Leichhardt may refer to:

 Division of Leichhardt, electoral District for the Australian House of Representatives
 Leichhardt Highway, a highway of Queensland, Australia
 Leichhardt Way, an Australian road route
 Leichhardt, New South Wales, inner-western suburb of Sydney, Australia
 Leichhardt Oval, a football stadium
 Leichhardt, Queensland, a suburb of Ipswich, Queensland
 Ludwig Leichhardt, 19th century Prussian explorer of Australia
 Municipality of Leichhardt, former local government area of Sydney, Australia

See also
 Electoral district of Leichhardt (disambiguation)